Éder Guterres Silveira (born 7 October 1977), known as Éder or Éder Gaúcho, is a Brazilian retired footballer who played as a central defender.

Club career
Born in São Borja, Rio Grande do Sul, Gaúcho started his professional career with Grêmio Foot-Ball Porto Alegrense. In 2000, he moved abroad, joining U.D. Leiria of Portugal, where he remained two seasons.

Éder stayed in the country afterwards, transferring to Boavista F.C. with the aid of an investment fund, which signed a portion of the player's rights and received a portion of any future transfer fee. He played all four games in the campaign's UEFA Champions League qualifying rounds, adding 12 matches and one goal in the 2002–03 UEFA Cup as the Porto club reached the semifinals.

In the 2005 summer, Gaúcho signed for Russian side FC Terek Grozny. In February 2007, however, he returned to Brazil and agreed to a six-month contract with Sertãozinho Futebol Clube, which appeared in the Paulistan League. In July he returned to Leiria, notably scoring in the 4–1 home win over FK Hajduk Kula in the second leg of the last qualifying round of the 2007 UEFA Intertoto Cup which subsequently qualified for the UEFA Cup, with his team being eliminated in the first round of the competition.

In July 2008, Éder joined Al-Nassr FC of Saudi Arabia – he also played in the Middle East region for Al-Rayyan SC, appearing in the 2009 Emir of Qatar Cup final. In January 2010 he left the club, in exchange for Pascal Feindouno.

International career
Éder played for Brazil under-20's at the 1997 FIFA World Youth Championship in Malaysia. As the national team exited in the quarter-finals, he scored in a 10–0 demolition of Belgium in the round-of-16.

Honours
UEFA Intertoto Cup: 2007
Campeonato Gaúcho: 1999

References

External links
CBF data 
Futpédia profile 

1977 births
Living people
Sportspeople from Rio Grande do Sul
Brazilian footballers
Association football defenders
Campeonato Brasileiro Série A players
Grêmio Foot-Ball Porto Alegrense players
Sertãozinho Futebol Clube players
Primeira Liga players
U.D. Leiria players
Boavista F.C. players
Russian Premier League players
FC Akhmat Grozny players
Saudi Professional League players
Al Nassr FC players
Al-Rayyan SC players
UAE Pro League players
Sharjah FC players
Baniyas Club players
Brazil youth international footballers
Brazil under-20 international footballers
Brazilian expatriate footballers
Expatriate footballers in Portugal
Expatriate footballers in Russia
Expatriate footballers in Saudi Arabia
Expatriate footballers in Qatar
Expatriate footballers in the United Arab Emirates
Brazilian expatriate sportspeople in Portugal
Brazilian expatriate sportspeople in Russia
Brazilian expatriate sportspeople in Saudi Arabia
Brazilian expatriate sportspeople in Qatar
Brazilian expatriate sportspeople in the United Arab Emirates